Ferdinand Bardamu is the  protagonist of Louis-Ferdinand Céline's 1932 novel Journey to the End of the Night (Voyage au bout de la nuit).

The hero's first name, Ferdinand, is shared with Céline, the author/narrator for whom he acts as a surrogate. His surname, Bardamu, is derived from the French words Barda—the "pack" carried by World War I soldiers—and mu, the past participle of the verb mouvoir, meaning to move. As the novel progresses, circumstances compel Bardamu to give up his "baggage" of conventional morality and the optimism of youth.

Footnotes 
The two would later be combined as "Louis Ferdinand Bardamu" by the narrator Raphael of Modiano's La Place de L'étoile (1968).

Citations

References 
 
 
 

Characters in French novels of the 20th century
Louis-Ferdinand Céline
Author surrogates
Literary characters introduced in 1932